The 1995 Skoal Bandit Copper World Classic was a pickup truck race held on February 5, 1995 at the Phoenix International Raceway in Avondale, Arizona. It was the first event of the 1995 NASCAR SuperTruck Series, the first season of what is now the NASCAR Gander RV & Outdoors Truck Series, and the first edition of what is now the Lucas Oil 150.

Ron Hornaday Jr. of Dale Earnhardt, Inc. won the pole position, while Mike Skinner of Richard Childress Racing won the race after leading a race-high 30 laps.

Background

Phoenix International Raceway, which opened in 1964, began hosting NASCAR Winston Cup Series races in 1988.

The Truck Series was planned in 1991 and officially created in 1994. During the year, seven exhibition races were held and broadcast by TNN under the Winter Heat Series banner. TNN returned to cover the Copper World Classic. Regarding Phoenix being the site of the series' inaugural race, Ron Hornaday stated, "Phoenix fits right into a lot of these drivers' hands because they all came from short tracks."

The race was one of five held for the 18th Annual Skoal Bandit Copper World Classic. Various drivers were attracted to the event, including Cup Series drivers Ken Schrader, Geoff Bodine and Terry Labonte, the latter having won the Cup race at Phoenix in 1994. Other drivers included off-road racing champion Roger Mears and former National Football League head coach Jerry Glanville. In the field of 33 drivers that competed in the race, Hornaday, Mike Skinner, Joe Ruttman, Butch Miller, Jack Sprague, Rick Carelli, Bill Sedgwick, Scott Lagasse, Tobey Butler and Sammy Swindell would eventually compete in all twenty races in the 1995 season.

Qualifying
Ken Schrader, Terry Labonte, Johnny Benson Jr. and Joe Bessey rounded out the top five.

Race
A crowd of 38,000 attended the race.

Ron Hornaday led the first 23 laps of the race. During that timespan, two caution flags were flown: on lap 4, Troy Beebe spun out in turn 2, and on lap 17, Gary Collins spun in turn 4. On lap 24, Terry Labonte look the lead, and after a lap, the third caution occurred when seven trucks (Tobey Butler, John Borneman, Bob Keselowski, Steve McEachern, Bill Sedgwick, Jerry Glanville and T. J. Clark) crashed in turn 4. Labonte led until lap 29, and Hornaday led for three laps. On lap 33, Mike Skinner claimed first, leading for 29 laps; Skinner lost the lead on lap 61, when a yellow flag for debris was flown. Labonte reclaimed the lead during the period. On lap 72, Sedgwick, Keselowski and Bob Strait spun in the dogleg, bringing out another caution. Five laps later, the final yellow of the race was flown when Glanville, Kerry Teague, Scott Lagasse and P. J. Jones crashed in turn 4. When the green flag waved with two laps to go, Skinner retook the lead from Labonte, and held off Labonte's attempted charge to win by .09 seconds. Ken Schrader finished third, followed by Joe Bessey, Geoff Bodine, Jack Sprague, Butch Miller, Joe Ruttman, Hornaday and Johnny Benson. Six drivers did not finish the race: Rick Carelli (engine), Walker Evans (valve), Troy Beebe (suspension), Butch Gilliland (engine), Clark and Borneman (crashes).

Results

Race results

Standings after the race

References

Skoal Bandit Copper World Classic
Skoal Bandit Copper World Classic
NASCAR races at Phoenix Raceway